Cuci may refer to:

Cuci, Mureș, a commune in Mureș County, Romania
Cuci, a village in Bozieni, Neamț, Romania
Cuci, a village in Fârtățești Commune, Vâlcea County
Cuci (film), a 2008 Malaysian film
Cuci Amador Electro funk singer
Nickname for Brunello Cucinelli